Tehuelchesaurus is a genus of dinosaur. It is named in honor of the Tehuelche people, native to the Argentinian province of Chubut, where it was first found.

Description 

Tehuelchesaurus is most similar to Omeisaurus from the Middle Jurassic of China, but is distinguished by the shape of the coracoid, the stouter radius and ulna, and the shapes of the pubis and ischium; all the dorsal vertebrae have pseudopleurocoels (deep depressions in the centra but without internal chambers) and opisthocoelous centra, unlike in Barapasaurus and Patagosaurus. It was named by Rich, Vickers-Rich, Gimenez, Cuneo, Puerta & Vacca in 1999. The type species is Tehuelchesaurus benitezii, named after Aldo Benitez, who discovered the holotype.

References

Further reading 
 T. H. Rich, P. Vickers-Rich, O. Gimenez, R. Cúneo, P. Puerta and R. Vacca. 1999. A new sauropod dinosaur from Chubut province, Argentina. Proceedings of the Second Gondwanan Dinosaur Symposium, National Science Museum Monographs 15:61-84

Macronarians
Dinosaur genera
Oxfordian first appearances
Kimmeridgian life
Tithonian life
Late Jurassic extinctions
Late Jurassic dinosaurs of South America
Fossils of Argentina
Jurassic Argentina
Cañadón Asfalto Basin
Fossil taxa described in 1999